Ian Spence is a Scottish former football player and manager.

Football career
Spence's footballing career started at junior  side Armadale Thistle. In January 1957 he joined Stirling Albion. An attacking player, Spence was top scorer in the 1957/58 season with 20 goals helping Stirling Albion to win the league and gain promotion to the first division.  He spent a brief spell at Raith Rovers between October 1959 and January 1960 before returning to Stirling Albion where he captained the side. He was released by the club in 1961 and the then moved to Stenhousemuir.  In 1963 he joined Berwick Rangers as player/manager  and in 1964 he took them to the semi-final of the Scottish League Cup losing 3-1 to Rangers.  After leaving Berwick Rangers in 1966 he managed Dumbarton.

References

Living people
Scottish footballers
Scottish football managers
Armadale Thistle F.C. players
Raith Rovers F.C. players
Stenhousemuir F.C. players
Berwick Rangers F.C. players
Berwick Rangers F.C. managers
Stirling Albion F.C. players
Dumbarton F.C. managers
Scottish Football League managers
Scottish Football League players
Third Lanark A.C. players
Association football inside forwards
Year of birth missing (living people)